The Journal of Borderlands Studies is a peer-reviewed academic journal covering all aspects of borderlands studies. The journal was established in 1986 and is published by Routledge on behalf of the Association for Borderlands Studies. It appears five times a year and the editors-in-chief are Sergio Peña (El Colegio de la Frontera Norte) and Christophe Sohn (Luxembourg Institute of Socio-Economic Research).

Abstracting and indexing
The journal is abstracted and indexed in the Emerging Sources Citation Index and Scopus.

References

External links

Publications established in 1986
English-language journals
Routledge academic journals
5 times per year journals
Area studies journals